Katja Hannele Riipi (born 26 October 1975) is a Finnish retired ice hockey player and former member of the Finnish national ice hockey team. She won an Olympic bronze medal representing Finland in the women's ice hockey tournament at the 1998 Winter Olympics. A seven-time competitor in the IIHF Women's World Championship, she won bronze medals at the tournaments in 1997, 1999, 2000, and 2004. She also participated in the 1996 IIHF European Women Championships, winning bronze with Finland.

Riipi was born in Sodankylä.

References

External links
 
 
 

1975 births
Living people
People from Sodankylä
Finnish women's ice hockey forwards
Oulun Kärpät Naiset players
Ilves Naiset players
IHK Naiset players
HPK Kiekkonaiset players
Ice hockey players at the 2002 Winter Olympics
Ice hockey players at the 1998 Winter Olympics
Medalists at the 1998 Winter Olympics
Olympic bronze medalists for Finland
Olympic ice hockey players of Finland
Olympic medalists in ice hockey
Sportspeople from Lapland (Finland)